Drawing Down the Moon is the debut studio album by Finnish black metal band Beherit. It was released in November 1993, through Spinefarm Records. The album is notable for its usage of space-like synth sounds and occasional use of computer-altered vocals.

The lyrics to "Intro" were taken from the Seventh Satanic Statement, as transcribed by Anton LaVey on the Satanic Bible.

Track listing 

All music written by Marko Laiho.

 "Intro (Tireheb)" – 0:45
 "Salomon's Gate" – 3:42
 "Nocturnal Evil" – 2:53
 "Sadomatic Rites" – 4:07
 "Black Arts" – 3:33
 "The Gate of Nanna" – 4:15
 "Nuclear Girl" – 1:32
 "Unholy Pagan Fire" – 3:54
 "Down There..." – 2:36
 "Summerlands" – 3:20
 "Werewolf, Semen and Blood" – 3:08
 "Thou Angel of the Gods" – 2:23
 "Lord of Shadows and Goldenwood" – 3:23

Personnel

Beherit 

 Nuclear Holocausto (Marko Laiho) – vocals, rhythm and lead guitars, synths
 Black Jesus (Santtu Siippainen) – bass guitar
 Necropervessor (Pekka Virkanen) – drums

Additional 

 Nuclear Holocausto – production

References

External links 

 Drawing Down the Moon at AllMusic

1993 debut albums
Beherit albums